Zanclopteryx is a genus of moths in the family Geometridae.

Species
Zanclopteryx aculeataria Herrich-Schaffer, 1855
Zanclopteryx conspersa Warren, 1908
Zanclopteryx floccosa Warren, 1897
Zanclopteryx mexicana Prout, 1910
Zanclopteryx punctiferata Prout, 1910
Zanclopteryx subsimilis Warren, 1897
Zanclopteryx uniferata (Walker, 1863)
Zanclopteryx venata Warren, 1897

References
Natural History Museum Lepidoptera genus database

Oenochrominae